Gandler is a surname. Notable people with the surname include:

 Markus Gandler (born 1966), Austrian cross-country skier
 Rudolf Gandler, Austrian Paralympic athlete
 Stefan Gandler (born 1964), German philosopher and social scientist

See also
 Mandler